Faris Hammouti (born 21 January 1997) is a Moroccan professional footballer who plays as a centre-back for Den Bosch in the Dutch Eerste Divisie.

Professional career
Hammouti began his football training with IJFC for the 2005-06 season, and after a year transferred to the Feyenoord academy. He began as a winger, moved to midfield, and then settled into playing as a defender. After 10 years in the academy, Hammouti signed his first professional contract with Feyenoord on 16 June 2016.

On 31 January 2017, Hammouti joined Almere City FC for the rest of the 2016-17 season. Hammouti extended his loan at Almere City for another year on 31 May 2017, opting to stay with the team during the 2017–18 season.

On 30 August 2022, Hammouti signed a two-year contract with Den Bosch.

International career
Born in the Netherlands to Moroccan parents, Hammouti is a youth international for Morocco.

References

External links
 
 Almere City Profile

1997 births
Living people
Footballers from Utrecht (city)
Association football defenders
Moroccan footballers
Morocco youth international footballers
Dutch footballers
Dutch sportspeople of Moroccan descent
Feyenoord players
Almere City FC players
FC Den Bosch players
Eerste Divisie players
Derde Divisie players